Épila is a municipality in the province of Zaragoza, Aragon, Spain. Its population in 2005 was approximately 4,100.

The Santuario de la Virgen de Rodanas is located in the Sierra de Nava Alta, west of Épila town. The road to the sanctuary from Épila is not paved.

Personalities
John I of Castile was born in Épila.

Photogallery

See also 
 List of municipalities in Zaragoza

References

External links

Municipalities in the Province of Zaragoza